WMIX (940 AM, "News Talk 940") is an American radio station licensed to serve the community of Mount Vernon, Illinois.  The station is owned by Withers Broadcasting and the WMIX broadcast license is held by Withers Broadcasting Company of Illinois, LLC.

The station was assigned the call sign "WMIX" by the Federal Communications Commission (FCC).

Withers Broadcasting registered the "WMIX" branding as a registered trademark, which prevents other stations, many of them carrying some sort of Mix FM format, from using WMIX as a branding without permission.

Programming
WMIX broadcasts a news/talk radio format branded "News Talk 940" plus adult standards music in the evening and overnight. , local programming includes a morning drive program hosted by Jeff Rollins and Carl Hampton in mid-days. Syndicated programming includes The Rush Limbaugh Show, Jim Bohannon, plus adult standards music blocks hosted by Chick Watkins and Don Reid from Dial Global's "America's Best Music" radio network.

Translators
WMIX programming is also carried on three broadcast translator stations to extend or improve the coverage area of the station.

References

External links
WMIX official website

MIX
News and talk radio stations in the United States
Radio stations established in 1946
Jefferson County, Illinois
1946 establishments in Illinois